is a Japanese language word for Corvée. The U.S. Library of Congress estimates that in Java, between 4 and 10 million rōmusha  were forced to work by the Japanese military during the Japanese occupation of the Dutch East Indies (now Indonesia) in World War II, many of whom toiled under harsh conditions and either died or were stranded far from home. However, the term was not closely defined by either the Japanese or the Allies and estimates for the total numbers of rōmusha sometimes encompass both the kinrōhōshi unpaid laborers, as well as native auxiliary forces, such as troops of the Japanese-supported Indonesian volunteer army Pembela Tanah Air (PETA) and voluntary transmigrants to other islands in Indonesia.

Overview

The rōmusha were unpaid conscripted laborers, mobilized in Sumatra and eastern Indonesia as well as Java. Some ten percent were women. Their tenures of service ranged from one day to the time required to complete a specific project. The types of work required were very diverse, ranging from light housekeeping work to heavy construction.  As a general rule, the rōmusha were mobilized within each regency and were able to walk to work from home. However, for very large construction projects, the rōmusha could be sent to other regencies. When their specified period was up, they were returned home and replaced with new workers. However, many were sent away from Indonesia to other Japanese-held areas in Southeast Asia.

Although exact figures are unknown, M. C. Ricklefs estimates that between 200,000 and 500,000 Javanese laborers were sent away from Java to the outer islands, and as far as Burma and Thailand. Of those taken off Java, Ricklefs estimates that only 70,000 survived the war. On the other hand, Shigeru Satō, estimates that around 270,000 Javanese laborers were sent outside of Java, including around 60,000 in Sumatra. Satō estimates that 135,000 were repatriated to Java after the war by the Dutch and the British (not including those found in Sumatra). Apart from those repatriated, there were also those who returned by other means even before the Japanese capitulated. According to Satō, the proportion of rōmusha laborers who died or were stranded overseas amounts to around 15%.

History

The practice of unpaid corvée labor had been common during the colonial period of the Dutch East Indies. The wages paid to the rōmusha failed to keep up pace with inflation, and they were often forced to work under hazardous conditions with inadequate food, shelter or medical care. The general Japanese treatment of labourers was poor. The rōmusha were supplemented by unpaid laborers, the kinrōhōshi, who performed mostly menial labour. The kinrōhōshi were recruited for a shorter duration than the rōmusha via tonarigumi neighborhood associations and were theoretically voluntary, although considerable social coercion was applied to "volunteers" as a show of loyalty to the Japanese cause. In 1944, the number of  kinrōhōshi in Java approximately amounted to 200,000 people. The brutality of the rōmusha and other forced labour systems was a key reason for the considerably high death rates among Indonesians under the Japanese occupation. A later UN report stated that four million people died in Indonesia as a result of the Japanese occupation. In addition to this, around 2.4 million people died in Java from famine during 1944–45.

From 1944, the PETA also utilised thousands of rōmusha for the construction of military facilities, and in economic projects to help make Java more self-supporting in the face of Allied blockades.

The Japanese military made very extensive use of such forced labour during the construction of the Burma-Thailand Railway during 1942–43, and the Sumatra Railway in 1943–45. The death rate among rōmusha from atrocities, starvation, and disease far outstripped the death rate among Allied prisoners of war.

Footnotes

Japanese occupation of the Dutch East Indies
Unfree labor during World War II